Cheongoksan (청옥산; 靑玉山) refers to three mountains in South Korea:

Cheongoksan (Jeongseon/Pyeongchang) in Gangwon-do
Cheongoksan (Donghae/Samcheok) in Gangwon-do
Cheongoksan (North Gyeongsang) in Bongwha County, Gyeongsangbuk-do